Centrum is a residential area in Luleå, Sweden. It had 7,760 inhabitants in 2010.

References

External links
Centrum at Luleå Municipality

Luleå